The following is a dynamic and expanding list of African-American historic places in the United States and territories which have been documented to be of significance to illustrating the experience of the African diaspora in America. Some are local landmarks while others are on the National Register of Historic Places. The stories of the contributions, hardships, and aspirations of all American people can be seen in the experiences of African Americans at these physical locations. The formal preservation of these sites dates back to at least 1917 according to architectural historian Brent Leggs when efforts to save the Gothic Revival home of abolitionist and statesman Frederic Douglass were launched. “Even when it wasn’t called ‘preservation,’ this work was already happening.”

The places listed below represent the achievements and struggles of African Americans. Visitors to these sites can gain a better understanding of the events and the people of that time. These places connected across time to create an understanding of what happened and why.

African-American historic places organized by period or topic
This outline has been adapted from other related Wikipedia articles and The Negro Pilgrimage in America by C. Eric Lincoln and Before the Mayflower; A History of the Negro in America; 1619-1964 by Lerone Bennett Jr.
Origins 

The Negro Pilgrimage in America or the African Past
The story of the African Americans begins in Africa. Early histories of Africa considered it the ‘Dark Continent’, both in the sense of the color of its people, but also for its lack of known civilizations. Studies beginning in the 1960s have found a rich history of civilization, including arts, architecture, public thought and major civilizations. The story of African Americans builds from these roots and can be traced through historic sites associated with the slave trade in America:
 Charlotte Amalie Historic District – Virgin Islands
 Fairvue - Kentucky
 The Grange
 Kingsley Plantation
 Old Slave Mart – South Carolina

American Revolution 

While the term ‘American Revolution’ connotes only the war period (1776–1783), the entire colonial experience is included. Free Negros were present during early campaigns of the war and throughout the war. In March 1770, Crispus Attucks died during the protest that has become known as the Boston Massacre. At the Battle of Bunker Hill, Peter Salem and Salem Poor, two free Negros valiantly served. Salem Poor was commended for his actions that day.
 Burns United Methodist Church
 Christiansted National Historic Site
 Hacienda Azucarera La Esperanza – Puerto Rico
 Hawikuh
 Jack Peterson Memorial, Croton-on-Hudson, New York

Slavery

For over 200 years, the American system of slavery held four million people of color in bondage. The effect was felt by all the people of the nation, including black, white, yellow, and red. It was premised on a system of racial supremacy that affected the development of the American Negro and the relationships of all American’s with persons of other races.
The first blacks in the new world did not arrive on the slave ship to Jamestown in 1619. Rather, it was Pedro Alonzo Niño, navigator on the Niña the smallest of Christopher Columbus's vessels. From that day, Negros participated in nearly every major Spanish exploration in the new world. Neflo de Olaña and thirty other Negros were with Balboa when they discovered the Pacific Ocean.

 Antioch Missionary Baptist Church – Richard Allen (organized the AME church)
 Jean Baptiste Point Du Sable Homesite – Jean Baptiste Point du Sable (1st settler of Chicago)
 First African Baptist Church, Richmond, Virginia
 Lumpkin's Jail, Richmond, Virginia
 Hacienda Azucarera La Esperanza – Puerto Rico
 Hawikuh – Estevanico
 Prince Hall Masonic Temple – Prince Hall (organized 1st Negro Masonic Lodge)

Slave revolts and insurrections
In the summer of 1791, Haiti witnessed the first successful slave revolt. This was not the first; it was one in a long series of revolts. Between 1663 and 1864, there were 109 revolts on land and another 55 at sea. Notable early insurrections include the 1712 uprising in New York City and the 1800 attack on Richmond, Virginia known as Gabriel's Rebellion. That same year, Denmark Vesey, a free black, planned to seize Charleston, South Carolina, but was foiled when betrayed.

 Belmont – Virginia
 John Brown Farm – John Brown’s birthplace. - New York
 John Brown House - New York
 John Brown Headquarters – Headquarters for the Harper’s Ferry Raid
 Estate Carolina Sugar Plantation
 Stono River Slave Rebellion – Site of the 1739 Stono Rebellion - South Carolina.

Abolition crisisWith the Louisiana Purchase in 1803, the United States gained a huge western dominion. With it, two aspects of American life came into stark comparison. The first was the expansion of slavery across the southern half of the nation, creating a vast agricultural empire based on a large rural workforce. The second was Manifest Destiny, the expansion of a free society westward across the continent. The economic realities in the south precluded the development of a strong abolitionist base, while the lack of slavery among the industrialized north, neither supported nor abhorred the abolitionist cause. By 1835, William Lloyd Garrison had established The Liberator as the nation’s most militant abolitionist newspaper. Over the next 30 years, the north and the south would try to find ways to coexist with two different economic systems and a growing abolitionist movement.
Allen Chapel African Methodist Episcopal Church – Terre Haute, Indiana
Levi Coffin House – Fountain City, Indiana
Frederick Douglass National Historic Site – Washington D.C.
Eleutherian College – Lancaster, Indiana
Harpers Ferry National Historical Park – West Virginia
Little Jerusalem AME Church – Cornwells Heights-Eddington, Pennsylvania
William C. Nell House – Boston, Massachusetts
Harriet Beecher Stowe House – Brunswick, Maine
Liberty Farm – Worcester, Massachusetts
Mount Zion United Methodist Church-Washington, D.C.
White Horse Farm-Phoenixville, Pennsylvania

Civil war and emancipation

The American Civil War is often seen as a war between white men over the fate of the black man. From the beginning, the African-American peoples played a significant role in the war. As early as July 1861, three months after Fort Sumter, the United States Congress passed the first Confiscation Act, granting freedom to any slave who had been used to support the Confederate war efforts, once they were behind Union Lines. Quickly General Sherman employed this new manpower in the construction of Union facilities from which to prosecute the war. With the preliminary Emancipation Proclamation on September 22, 1862, the First Regiment Louisiana Heavy Artillery and All Negro unit was founded by General B.F. Butler.  The War Department quickly authorized the enlistment of Negro soldier with the founding of the Massachusetts Fifty-Fourth and Fifty-Fifth Infantry Regiments. By the end of the war, there were over 150 all-Negro regiments. On September 29, 1864, the Third Division of the Eighteenth Corp of the Army of the James, moved forward to take the New Market Heights outside Richmond, Virginia. The key role in this advance was given to the ‘all-Negro’ division. By the end of the day, the Union Army would stand on the heights overlooking the city of Richmond with a loss of 584 men and 10 Congressional Medal honorees now in their ranks. This action marked the beginning of the dissolution of the Confederate Government and the end of the war the following April.

Boston African American National Historic Site – Boston, Massachusetts
Camilla-Zack Community Center District – Mayfield, Georgia
Fort Pillow – Tennessee
Goodwill Plantation – Eastover, South Carolina
John Mercer Langston House – Oberlin, Ohio
Lewis O'Neal Tavern – Versailles, Kentucky
Oakview – Holly Springs, Mississippi
Olustee Battlefield – Olustee, Florida
Port Hudson – Port Hudson, Louisiana
Seaside Plantation-Beaufort, South Carolina
Slate Hill Cemetery-Morrisville, Pennsylvania
Sulphur Trestle Fort Site – Elkmont, Alabama

Reconstruction-era
Alcorn State University Historic District – Lorman, Mississippi
Barber House – Hopkins, South Carolina
Bethel African Methodist Episcopal Church – Batesville, Arkansas
Clarksville Historic District – Lancaster, Indiana
Daufuskie Island Historic District – South Carolina
Fair-Rutherford and Rutherford Houses – Columbia, South Carolina
Freeman Chapel C.M.E. Church – Hopkinsville, Kentucky
Laurel Grove-South Cemetery – Savannah, Georgia
Lincoln University Hilltop Campus Historic District – Jefferson City, Missouri
Ploeger-Kerr-White House-Bastrop, Texas
Springfield Baptist Church-Greensboro, Georgia
Stone Hall, Atlanta University – Atlanta, Georgia
Charles Sumner High School – St. Louis, Missouri
Lyman Trumbull House – Alton, Illinois
Working Benevolent Temple and Professional Building – Greenville, South Carolina

Segregation and the rise of Jim Crow

Wililam R. Allen School – Lorman, Mississippi
Black Theater of Ardmore – Ardmore, Oklahoma
Davis Avenue Branch, Mobile Public Library – Mobile, Alabama
Fairbanks Flats – Lancaster, Indiana
Fourth Avenue Historic District – Birmingham, Alabama
Indiana Avenue Historic District – Indianapolis, Indiana
Main Building, Arkansas Baptist College – Hopkinsville, Arkansas
Smithfield Historic District – Savannah, Georgia
Sweet Auburn Historic District – Jefferson City, Missouri
Ward Chapel AME Church-Bastrop, Texas

Northern Migration 

Chicago Bee Building – Chicago, Illinois
Robert S. Abbott House – Chicago, Illinois
Bethany Baptist Church – Chislehurst, New Jersey
Durham Memorial A.M.E. Zion Church – Buffalo, New York
Langston Terrace Dwellings – Washington, D.C.
Liberty Baptist Church – Evansville, Indiana
Wabash Avenue YMCA – Chicago, Illinois

Expanding opportunities 
Alcorn State University Historic District – Lorman, Mississippi
Barber House – Hopkins, South Carolina
Bethel African Methodist Episcopal Church – Batesville, Arkansas
Clarksville Historic District – Lancaster, Indiana
Daufuskie Island Historic District – South Carolina
Fair-Rutherford and Rutherford Houses – Columbia, South Carolina
Freeman Chapel C.M.E. Church – Hopkinsville, Kentucky
Laurel Grove-South Cemetery – Savannah, Georgia
Lincoln University Hilltop Campus Historic District – Jefferson City, Missouri
Ploeger-Kerr-White House,-Bastrop, Texas
Springfield Baptist Church-Greensboro, Georgia
Stone Hall, Atlanta University – Atlanta, Georgia
Charles Sumner High School – St. Louis, Missouri
Lyman Trumbull House – Alton, Illinois
Working Benevolent Temple and Professional Building – Greenville, South Carolina

Civil rights movement  

16th Street Baptist Church - Birmingham, Alabama
Agricultural and Technical College of North Carolina Historic District – Greensboro, North Carolina
Brown Chapel African Methodist Episcopal Church – Selma, Alabama
City of St. Jude Historic District – Montgomery, Alabama
Dexter Avenue Baptist Church – Montgomery, Alabama
First African Baptist Church – Tuscaloosa, Alabama
Martin Luther King Jr. Historic District – Atlanta, Georgia
Lincolnville Historic District – St. Augustine, Florida
Little Rock Central High School – Little Rock, Arkansas
Malcolm X House Site – Omaha, Nebraska
Howard Thurman House-Daytona Beach, Florida
Dr. Cyril O. Spann Medical Office- Columbia, South Carolina

Cemeteries 

The preservation of African-American cemeteries is an integral part of documenting Black history and heritage. Many lands where enslaved or freed black individuals were buried are threatened by development and neglect though new efforts are underway to protect these historic places.
 African Burial Ground National Monument, New York, New York
 African Jackson Cemetery, Piqua, Ohio
 Barton Heights Cemeteries, city of Richmond, Virginia
 East End Cemetery, city of Richmond, Virginia
 Eden Cemetery, Collingdale, Pennsylvania
 Evergreen Cemetery, city of Richmond, Virginia
 Gethsemane Cemetery, Little Ferry, New Jersey
 Gospel Pilgrim Cemetery, Athens, Georgia
 Gower Cemetery, Edmond, Oklahoma
 Hampton Springs Cemetery (Black Section), Carthage, Arkansas
 Harlem African Burial Ground, New York, New York
 Laurel Grove Cemetery – Savannah, Georgia
 Lebanon Cemetery, Philadelphia, Pennsylvania
 Magnolia Cemetery including Mobile National Cemetery, Mobile, Alabama
 Mount Pisgah Benevolence Cemetery, Romney, West Virginia
 Newburgh Colored Burial Ground, Newburgh, New York
 New Hope Missionary Baptist Church Cemetery, Historic Section, Lake Village, Arkansas
 Portsmouth African Burying Ground, Portsmouth, New Hampshire
 Rye African-American Cemetery, Rye, New York
 Saint Paul's Church National Historic Site, Mount Vernon, New York
Shockoe Bottom African Burial Ground - city of Richmond, Virginia
 Shockoe Hill African Burying Ground, city of Richmond, Virginia
 Slate Hill Cemetery, Morrisville, Pennsylvania
 St. David African Methodist Episcopal Zion Cemetery, Sag Harbor, New York
 Stony Hill Cemetery, Harrison, New York
 Toussaint L'Ouverture County Cemetery, Tennessee

African-American historic places organized by state or territory

Alabama

 16th Street Baptist Church, Birmingham
 Alabama Penny Savings Bank, Birmingham
 Brown Chapel A.M.E. Church, Selma
 Butler Chapel AME Zion Church, Greenville
 Calhoun School Principal’s House, Calhoun
 City of St. Jude Historic District, Montgomery
 Dave Patton House, Mobile
 Dexter Avenue Baptist Church, Montgomery
 Domestic Science Building, Normal
 Dr. A.M. Brown House, Birmingham
 Ebenezer Missionary Baptist Church, Auburn
 Emanuel AME Church, Mobile
 First African Baptist Church, Tuscaloosa
 First Baptist Church, Greenville
 First Baptist Church, Selma
 First Congregational Church of Marion, Marion
 Fourth Avenue Historic District, Birmingham
 Hawthorn House, Mobile
 Hunter House, Mobile
 Jefferson Franklin Jackson House, Montgomery
 West Park, Birmingham
 Laura Watson House, Gainesville
 Lebanon Chapel AME Church, Fairhope
 Magnolia Cemetery, including Mobile National Cemetery, Mobile
 Mount Zion Baptist Church, Anniston
 Murphy-Collins House, Tuscaloosa
 Davis Avenue Branch, Mobile Public Library, Mobile
 North Lawrence-Monroe Street Historic District, Montgomery
 Old Ship African Methodist Episcopal Zion Church, Montgomery
 Pastorium, Dexter Avenue Baptist Church, Montgomery
 Phillips Memorial Auditorium, Marion
 Pratt City Carline Historic District, Birmingham
 Rickwood Field, Birmingham
 Searcy Hospital, Mount Vernon
 Smithfield Historic District, Birmingham
 St. Louis Street Missionary Baptist Church, Mobile
 State Street AME Zion Church, Mobile
 Stone Street Baptist Church, Mobile
 Sulphur Trestle Fort Site, Elkmont
 Swayne Hall, Talladega
 Talladega College Historic District, Talladega
 Theological Building- AME Zion Theological Institute, Greenville
 Tulane Building, Montgomery
 Tuskegee Institute National Historic Site, Tuskegee
 Twin Beach AME Church, Fairhope
 Ward Nicholson Corner Store, Greenville
 West Fifteenth Street Historic District, Anniston
 Westwood Plantation (Boundary Increase), Uniontown
 Windham Construction Office Building, Birmingham

Arizona
 Phoenix Union Colored High School, Phoenix

Arkansas

 Bethel African Methodist Episcopal Church, Batesville
 Dunbar Junior and Senior High School and Junior College, Little Rock
 Hampton Springs Cemetery (Black Section), Carthage
 Henry Clay Mills House, Van Buren
 Ish House, Little Rock
 Kiblah School, Doddridge
 Little Rock High School, Little Rock
 Main Building, Arkansas Baptist College, Little Rock
 Mosaic Templars of America Headquarters Building, Little Rock
 Mount Olive United Methodist Church, Van Buren
 Mount Zion Missionary Baptist Church, Brinkley
 New Hope Missionary Baptist Church Cemetery, Historic Section, Lake Village
 Taborian Hall, Little Rock
 Wortham Gymnasium, Oak Grove

California

 Allensworth Historic District, Allensworth
 Bethel African Methodist Episcopal Church, San Francisco
 California State Convention of Colored Citizens
 First African Methodist Episcopal Church of Los Angeles, Los Angeles
 Liberty Hall, Oakland
 Moses Rodgers House, Stockton
 Somerville Hotel, Los Angeles
 Sugg House, Sonora

Colorado
 Barney L. Ford Building, Denver
 Justina Ford House, Denver
 Winks Panorama, Pinecliffe
Earl School, a rare example of a building associated with rural African-Americans in Colorado, of a farming homestead colony.

Connecticut

 First Church of Christ, Farmington
 Goffe Street Special School for Colored Children, New Haven
 Lighthouse Archeological Sites, Barkhamstead
 Mary and Eliza Freeman Houses, Bridgeport
 Mather Homestead, Hartford
 Prudence Crandall House, Canterbury

Delaware

 Harmon School, Millsboro
 Johnson School, Millsboro
 Lewes Historic District, Lewes
 Loockeman Hall, Dover
 Odessa Historic District, Odessa
 Old Fort Church Christiana
 Public School No. 111-c, Christiana
 Smyrna Historic District, Smyrna

District of Columbia

Florida

Georgia

 Gospel Pilgrim Cemetery, Athens

Hawaii
African American Diversity Cultural Center

Idaho
 St. Paul Missionary Baptist Church, Boise

Illinois

 Christian Hill Historic District, Alton
 Dr. Daniel Hale Williams House, Chicago
 Eighth Regiment Armory, Chicago
 New Philadelphia Town Site / Free Frank McWorter Grave Site, Barry
 Ida B. Wells-Barnett House, Chicago
 Jean Baptiste Point Du Sable Homesite, Chicago
 Lyman Trumbull House, Alton
 Overton Hygienic Building, Chicago
 Owen Lovejoy Homestead, Princeton
 Quinn Chapel of the AME Church, Chicago
 Robert S. Abbott House, Chicago
 Unity Hall, Chicago (located in the Black Metropolis-Bronzeville District of Chicago)
 Victory Sculpture, Chicago
 Wabash Avenue YMCA, Chicago

Indiana

 Allen Chapel African Methodist Episcopal Church, Terre Haute
 Bethel AME Church, Franklin
 Booker T. Washington School, Rushville
 Crispus Attucks High School, Indianapolis
 Eleutherian College, Lancaster
 Iddings-Gilbert-Leader-Anderson Block, Kendallville
 Indiana Avenue Historic District, Indianapolis
 J. Woodrow Wilson House, Marion
 Levi Coffin House, Fountain City (NHL)
 Liberty Baptist Church, Evansville
 Lockefield Garden Apartments, Indianapolis
 Madame C. J. Walker Building, Indianapolis
 Minor House, Indianapolis
 Old Richmond Historic District, Richmond
 Ransom Place Historic District, Indianapolis
 Rockville Historic District, Rockville
 St. Augustine's Episcopal Church, Gary
 Theodore Roosevelt High School (Gary)

Iowa

Alexander Clark House, Muscatine
Bethel AME Church, Cedar Rapids
Bethel AME Church, Davenport
Bethel AME Church, Iowa City
Burns United Methodist Church, Des Moines
Buxton Historic Townsite, Lovilia
Fort Des Moines Provisional Army Officer Training School, Des Moines
Second Baptist Church, Centerville

Kansas

 Nicodemus Historic District, Nicodemus
 John Brown Cabin. Osawatomie
 George Washington Carver Homestead Site, Beeler
 Arkansas Valley lodge No. 21, Prince Hall Masons, Wichita
 Calvary Baptist, Wichita
 Brown v. Board of Education National Historic Site, Topeka

Kentucky

A. Jackson Crawford Building, Somerset
Abner Knox farm, Danville
Anderson House, Haskingsville
Andrew Muldrow Quarters, Tyrone
Artelia Anderson Hall, Paduch
Ash Emison Quarters, Delaplain
Bayless Quarters, North Middletown
Bethel AME Church, Shelbyville
Bloomfield Historic District, Bloomfield
Broadway Temple AME Zion Church, Louisville
Central Colored School, Louisville
Chandler Normal School Building and Webster Hall, Lexington
Charity’s House, Falmouth
Chestnut Street Baptist Church, Louisville
Church of Our Merciful Saviour, Louisville
E.E. Hume Hall, Frankfort
Embry Chapel Church, Elizabethtown
Emery-Price Historic District, Covington
First African Baptist Church and Parsonage, Georgetown
First African Baptist Church, Lexington
First Baptist Church, Elizabethtown
First Baptist Church, Frankfort
First Colored Baptist Church, Bowling Green
Freeman Chapel C.M.E. Church, Hopkinsville
Hogan Quarters, Versailles
Jackson Hall, Kentucky State University, Frankfort
James Briscoe Quarters, Delaplain
Jeffersontown Colored School, Jeffersontown
John Leavell Quarters, Bryantville
Johnson’s Chapel AME Zion Church, Springfield
Johnson-Pence House, Georgetown
Joseph Patterson Quarters, Midway
KEAS Tabernacle Christian Methodist Episcopal Church, Mount Sterling
Knights of Pythias Temple, Louisville
Lewis O'Neal Tavern, Versailles
Limerick Historic District (Boundary Increase), Louisville
Lincoln Hall, Berea
Lincoln Institute Complex, Simpsonville
Lincoln School, Paduch
Louisville Free Public Library, Western Colored Branch, Louisville
Meriwether House, Louisville
Midway Historic District, Midway
Minor Chapel AME Church, Taylorsville
Mount Vernon AME Church, Gamaliel
Mt. Moriah Baptist Church, Middleboro
Municipal College Campus, Simmons University, Louisville
Old Statehouse Historic District, Frankfort
Perry Shelburne House, Taylorsville
Pisgah Rural Historic District, Lexington/Versailles
Poston House, Hopkinsville
Reed Road Rural Historic District, Lexington
Russell Historic District, Louisville
Solomon Thomas House, Salvisa
South Frankfort Neighborhood Historic District, Frankfort
St. James AME Church, Ashland
St. John United Methodist Church, Shelbyville
Stone Barn on Brushy Creek, Carlisle
Stone Quarters on Burgin Road, Harrodsburg
The Grange, Paris
Thomas Chapel C.M.E. Church, Hickman
Union Station School, Paducah
University of Louisville Belknap Campus, Louisville
Whitney M. Young, Jr., Birthplace, Simpsonville

Louisiana

 Arna Wendell Bontemps House, Alexandria
 Badin-Roque House, Natchez
 Canebrake, Ferriday
 Carter Plantation, Springfield
 Central High School, Shreveport
 Congo Square, New Orleans
 Evergreen Plantation, Wallace 
 Fazendeville, St. Bernard Parish
 Flint-Goodridge Hospital of Dillard University, New Orleans
 Holy Rosary Institute, Lafayette
 James H. Dillard House, New Orleans
 Kenner and Kugler Cemeteries Archeological District, Norco
 Leland College, Baker
 Magnolia Plantation, Derry
 Maison de Marie Therese, Bermuda
 McKinley High School, Baton Rouge
 Melrose Plantation, Melrose
 Port Hudson, Port Hudson
 Southern University Archives Building, Scotlandville
 St. James AME Church, New Orleans
 St. Joseph Historic District, St. Joseph
 St. Joseph's School (Burnside, Louisiana)
 St. Paul Lutheran Church, Mansura
 St. Peter AME Church, New Orleans
 Tangipahoa Parish Training School Dormitory, Kentwood

Maine
 Green Memorial AME Zion Church, Portland
 John B. Russwurm House, Portland
 Harriet Beecher Stowe House, Brunswick
 Abyssinian Meeting House, Portland
 Malaga Island, Phippsburg

Maryland

 African Methodist Episcopal Church, Cumberland
 Berkley School, Darlington
 Don S.S. Goodloe House, Bowie
 Douglass Place, Baltimore
 Douglass Summer House, Highland Beach
 Eagle Harbor
 Frederick Douglass High School, Baltimore
 Grassland, Annapolis Junction
 John Brown’s Headquarters, Samples Manor
 Jonestown, Howard County
 L'Hermitage Slave Village Archeological Site, Frederick
McComas Institute, Joppa
 Mt. Gilboa Chapel, Oella
 Mt. Moriah African Methodist Episcopal Church, Annapolis
 Orchard Street United Methodist Church, Baltimore
 Public School No. 111, Baltimore
 Snow Hill Site, Port Deposit Archeological site.
 St. John’s Church, Ruxton
 Stanley Institute, Cambridge
 Stanton Center, Annapolis

Massachusetts
 Abiel Smith School, Boston
 African Meeting House, Boston
 Black Heritage Trail, Boston
 Boston African American National Historic Site, Boston
 Charles Street African Methodist Episcopal Church, Boston
 John Coburn House, Boston
 William C. Nell House, Boston
 John J. Smith House, Boston
 Maria Baldwin House, Cambridge
 Howe House, Cambridge
 William Monroe Trotter House, Dorchester
 William E.B. Du Bois Boyhood Homesite, Great Barrington
 Camp Atwater, North Brookfield
 Paul Cuffe Farm, Westport
 Liberty Farm, Worcester

Michigan
 Idlewild Historic District, Idlewild
 Breitmeyer-Tobin Building, Detroit
 Dunbar Hospital, Detroit
 Sacred Heart Roman Catholic Church, Covent, and Rectory, Detroit
 Second Baptist Church of Detroit, Detroit
 Ossian H. Sweet House, Detroit
 The Rainbow Inn, Petoskey
 Brewster-Wheeler Recreation Center, Detroit
 Sidney D. Miller Middle School, Detroit
 Detroit Wall, Detroit
 Nacirema Club, Detroit
 New Bethel Baptist Church, Detroit
 Underground Railroad Living Museum, Detroit
 Charles H. Wright Museum of African American History, Detroit
 Black Bottom, Detroit

Minnesota
 Avalon Hotel, Rochester
 Casiville Bullard House, St. Paul
 Edward S. Hall House, St. Paul
 Harriet Island Pavilion, St. Paul
 Highland Park Tower, St. Paul
 Holman Field Administration Building, St. Paul
 Lena O. Smith House, Minneapolis
 Pilgrim Baptist Church, St. Paul
 St. Mark’s African Methodist Episcopal Church, Duluth

Mississippi

Missouri

 First African Baptist Church (St. Louis, Missouri)
 Washington Park Cemetery, Berkeley

Montana
 Fort Missoula Historic District, Missoula

Nebraska

 Jewell Building, Omaha
 Malcolm X House Site, Omaha
 Webster Telephone Exchange Building, Omaha

Nevada
 Moulin Rouge Hotel, Las Vegas

New Hampshire
 Portsmouth African Burying Ground, Portsmouth

New Jersey
 Ackerman-Smith House, Saddle River
 Bethany Baptist Church, Newark
 Bordentown School
 Fisk Chapel, Fair Haven
 Gethsemane Cemetery, Little Ferry
 Grant AME Church, Chesilhurst
 Perth Amboy City Hall
 Roosevelt Stadium
 Shadow Lawn, West Long Branch
 State Street Public School, Newark
 William R. Allen School, Burlington

New Mexico
 Hawikuh, Zuni

New York

 369th Regiment Armory, Manhattan
 African Burial Ground National Monument, Manhattan
 A.M.E. Zion Church of Kingston and Mount Zion Cemetery, Kingston
 Apollo Theater, Manhattan
 Beecher-McFadden Estate, Peekskill
 Bethel AME Church and Manse, Huntington
 Claude McKay Residence, Manhattan
 Dunbar Apartments, Manhattan
 Durham Memorial A.M.E. Zion Church, Buffalo
 Edward Kennedy “Duke” Ellington House, Manhattan
 Elmendorf Reformed Church, Manhattan, and its newly discovered burial ground at 126th St and Second Avenue
 Florence Mills House, Manhattan
 Foster Memorial AME Zion Church, Tarrytown
 Harlem African Burial Ground, New York
 Harlem River Houses, Manhattan
 Harriet Tubman Home for the Aged, Auburn
 Houses on Hunterfly Road District, Brooklyn
 Jack Peterson Memorial, Croton-on-Hudson
 James Weldon Johnson House, Manhattan
 Jay Estate, Rye
 John Brown Farm, Lake Placid
 John Roosevelt “Jackie” Robinson House, Queens
 Langston Hughes House, Manhattan
 Lemuel Haynes House, New South Granville
 Louis Armstrong House, Queens
 Macedonia Baptist Church, Buffalo
 Matthew Henson Residence, Manhattan
 Minton’s Playhouse, Manhattan
 Monument to First Rhode Island Regiment, Yorktown Heights
 Newburgh Colored Burial Ground, Newburgh
 New York Amsterdam News Building, Manhattan
 Paul Robeson Home, Manhattan
 Ralph Bunche House, Queens
 Rapp Road Community Historic District, Albany
 Rye African-American Cemetery, Rye
 Saint Paul's Church National Historic Site, Mount Vernon
 Sandy Ground Historic Archeological District, Staten Island
 Schomburg Center for Research in Black Culture, Manhattan
 Skinny House (Mamaroneck, New York), Mamaroneck
 St. Benedict the Moor Church, Manhattan
 St David African Methodist Episcopal Zion Cemetery, Sag Harbor
 St. George’s Episcopal Church, New York
 St. James AME Church, Ithaca
 St. Nicholas Historic District, Manhattan
 St. Philip's Episcopal Church, Manhattan
 Stony Hill Cemetery, Harrison
 Sylvester Manor, Shelter Island
 Valley Road Historic District, Manhasset
 Villa Lewaro, Irvington
 Will Marion Cook House, Manhattan
 Waddington Historic Distinct, Waddington

North Carolina

Ohio

 Mount Zion Baptist Church, Athens
 Jacob Goldsmith House, Cleveland
 Lincoln Theatre, Columbus
 South School, Yellow Springs
 Colonel Charles Young House, Wilberforce
 William C. Johnston House and General Store, Burlington
 Macedonia Church, Burlington
 John Mercer Langston House, Oberlin
 African Jackson Cemetery, Piqua
 Classic Theater, Dayton
 Dunbar Historic District, Dayton
 Women’s Christian Association, Dayton
 St. Andrew's Episcopal Church, Cleveland
 St. Augustine's Episcopal Church, Youngstown
 St. Andrew's Episcopal Church, Cincinnati

Oklahoma

 A. J. Mason Building, Tullahassee
 Black Theater of Ardmore, Ardmore
 Boley Historic District, Boley
 C.L. Cooper Building, Eufaula 
 Douglass High School Auditorium, Ardmore
 Dunbar School, Ardmore
 Eastside Baptist Church, Okmulgee
 First Baptist Central Church, Okmulgee
 First Baptist Church, Muskogee
 Gower Cemetery, Edmond
 J. Cody Johnson Building, Wewoka
 Johnson Hotel and Boarding House, Duncan
 Manual Training High School for Negroes, Muskogee
 Melvin F. Luster House, Oklahoma City
 Mill-Washington School, Red Bird
 Miller Brothers 101 Ranch, Ponca City
 Okmulgee Colored Hospital, Okmulgee
 Okmulgee Downtown Historic District, Okmulgee
 Red Bird City Hall, Redbird
 Rock Front, Vernon
 Rosenwald Hall, Lima
 Taft City Hall, Taft
 Ward Chapel AME Church, Muskogee

Pennsylvania

 Adelphi School, Philadelphia
 Asbury AME Church, Chester
 Bethel AME Church, Reading
 Bethel African Methodist Episcopal Church of Monongahela City, Monongahela City
 Calvary Baptist Church, Chester
 Camptown Historic District, LaMott
 Cheyney University of Pennsylvania, Cheyney
 Clement Atkinson Memorial Hospital, Coatesville
 Crozer Theological Seminary, Upland
 Eden Cemetery, Collingdale
 Ercildoun Historic District in Chester County
 Frances Ellen Watkins Harper House, Philadelphia
 Hamorton Historic District, Kennett Square
 Henry O. Tanner House, Philadelphia
 Institute for Colored Youth, Philadelphia
 John Brown House, Chambersburg
 Lebanon Cemetery, Philadelphia
 Little Jerusalem AME Church, Cornwells Heights
 Melrose, Cheyney
 Mother Bethel AME Church, Philadelphia
 Mount Gilead AME Church, Buckingham Township
 Oakdale, Chadds Ford
 Slate Hill Cemetery, Morrisville
 Thompson Cottage, Concord Township
 Union Methodist Episcopal Church, Philadelphia
 Wesley AME Zion Church, Philadelphia
 White Hall of Bristol College, Croyden
 White Horse Farm, Phoenixville

Puerto Rico
 Hacienda Azucarera La Esperanza, Manati

Rhode Island
 Battle of Rhode Island Site, Portsmouth
 Cato Hill Historic District, Woonsocket
 Hard Scrabble, Providence
 Shiloh Baptist Church, Newport
 Smithville Seminary, Scituate

South Carolina

Hampton-Pinckney Historic District, Greenville
Paris Simkins House, Edgefield
Dr. Cyril O. Spann Medical Office, Columbia

Tennessee
 Orange Mound, Memphis, Memphis
 Toussaint L'Ouverture County Cemetery, Franklin

Texas

Utah
 Trinity AME Church, Salt Lake City

Vermont
 Old Stone House Museum, Brownington

Virginia

 Belmont – Virginia
Woodland Cemetery (Richmond, Virginia)
 Shockoe Bottom African Burial Ground (Richmond, Virginia)
Shockoe Hill African Burying Ground (Richmond, Virginia)
First African Baptist Church (Richmond, Virginia)
Lumpkin's Jail (Richmond, Virginia)
Maggie L. Walker National Historic Site (Richmond, Virginia)
Jackson Ward (Richmond, Virginia)
Sixth Mount Zion Baptist Church (Richmond, Virginia)
St. Luke Building (Richmond, Virginia)
Hippodrome Theater (Richmond, Virginia)
Virginia Union University (Richmond, Virginia)
Fourth Baptist Church Richmond, Virginia)
Ebenezer Baptist Church (Richmond, Virginia)

Virgin Islands
 Christiansted Historic District, Christiansted
 Christiansted National Historic Site, Christiansted
 Emmaus Moravian Church and Manse, Coral Bay
 Estate Carolina Sugar Plantation, Coral Bay
 Estate Neltjeberg, Charlotte Amalie
 Estate Niesky, Charlotte Amalie
 Fort Christian, Charlotte Amalie
 Friedensthal Mission, Christiansted
 New Herrnhut Moravian Church, Charlotte Amalie

Washington
Washington Hall (Seattle, Washington)

West Virginia

 African Zion Baptist Church, Malden
 Barnett Hospital and Nursing School, Huntington
 Bethel AME Church, Parkersburg
 Booker T. Washington High School, London
 Camp Washington-Carver Complex, Clifftop
 Canty House, Institute
 Douglass Junior and Senior High School, Huntington
 East Hall, Institute
 Elizabeth Harden Gilmore House, Charleston
 Garnet High School, Charleston
 Halltown Colored Free School, Halltown
 Halltown Union Colored Sunday School, Halltown
 Hancock House, Bluefield
 Henry Logan Memorial AME Church, Parkersburg
 Harpers Ferry National Historical Park, Harpers Ferry
 Storer College, Harpers Ferry
 Jefferson County Courthouse, Charles Town
 Kelly Miller High School, Clarksburg
 Maple Street Historic District, Lewisburg
 Mattie V. Lee Home, Charleston
 Mount Pisgah Benevolence Cemetery, Romney
 Mt. Pleasant School, Gerrardstown
 Mt. Tabor Baptist Church, Lewisburg
 Samuel Starks House, Charleston
 Second Ward Negro Elementary School, Morgantown
 Simpson Memorial United Methodist Church, Charleston
 Trinity Memorial Methodist Episcopal Church, Clarksburg
 Union Historic District, Union
 Washington Place, Romney
 West Virginia Colored Children's Home, Huntington
 Weston Colored School, Weston
 World War Memorial, Kimball

Wisconsin
 East Dayton Street Historic District, Madison

See also 

African-American Heritage Sites
List of museums focused on African Americans
 List of streets named after Martin Luther King, Jr.

References

Further reading
 Ballard, Allan; One More Day’s Journey: The Story of a Family and a People; New York; McGraw-Hill, 1984
 Durham, Philip, and Everettt L. Jones; The Adventures of the Negro Cowboys; New York: Bantam Books, 1969
 Ferguson, Leland G.; Uncommon Ground: Archeology and Colonial African America; Washington, D.C.; Smithsonian Institution Press, 1992
 Harley, Sharon, and Rosalyn Terborg-Penn; The Afro-American Woman: Struggles and Images; Port Washington; Kennikat Press; 1978
 Higgans, Nathan I.; Harlem Renaissance; New York; Oxford University Press; 1971
 Lyon, Elizabeth A.; Cultural and Ethnic Diversity in Historic Preservation. Information Series, no. 65; Washington D.C.; National Trust for Historic Preservation, 1992.
 McFeely, William S.; Frederick Douglass; New York; Norton, 1990.
 National Register of Historic Places: African American Historic Places; National Park Service & National Trust for Historic Preservation; The Preservation Press; Washington D.C.; 1994
 Painter, Nell Irvin; Exodusters: Black Migration to Kansas after Reconstruction; New York; Norton; 1976
 Reynolds, Gary A. and beryl Wright; Against the Odds: African American Artists and the Harmon Foundation. Newark, New Jersey; The Newark Museum, 1989

African
African American
African